Paula Bonte (1840-1902) was a German landscape painter.

Biography
Bonte was born on 15 April 1840 in Magdeburg, Germany. She  exhibited her work at the Woman's Building at the 1893 World's Columbian Exposition in Chicago, Illinois. Bonte was a friend of fellow landscape painter Marie von Keudell, with whom she shared a studio.

Bonte died on 21 September 1902 in Berlin.

References

External links
  

  
1840 births 
1902 deaths
19th-century German women artists
19th-century German painters